The Minnesota Streetcar Museum (MSM) is a transport museum that operates two heritage streetcar lines in Minneapolis, Minnesota and the western suburb of Excelsior.

Museum
The Museum was created as a result of the restructuring of the Minnesota Transportation Museum (MTM) during the winter of 2004–2005. The MTM was founded in 1962 to restore a streetcar, Twin City Rapid Transit Company No. 1300, that had been operated by the TCRT until the last streetcar lines were abandoned in favor of buses in 1954. Over time, the Museum diversified to include diesel and steam-powered trains, buses, steamboats and associated buildings, papers and photographs.

When the MTM was restructured during the winter of 2004 and 2005, the Minnesota Streetcar Museum was created and assumed ownership and operating responsibilities of the two streetcar lines. The Museum of Lake Minnetonka was also created as a result of the split and assumed ownership and operating responsibilities of the restored Steamboat Minnehaha, which was built by TCRT in 1906.

Rolling stock
The Minnesota Streetcar Museum now has five operable streetcars, three from TCRT's fleet and two from the Duluth Street Railway Company. A streetcar from Winona, Minnesota is currently under restoration while a Fargo-Moorhead Birney streetcar and a Mesaba Railway inter-urban car await restoration.

Como-Harriet Streetcar Line

In 1971 the MTM began operations on the Como-Harriet Streetcar Line, a heritage streetcar line in Minneapolis, Minnesota. The mile-plus-long Line runs along the original TCRT streetcar right-of-way between Lake Harriet and Lake Calhoun and is open to the public. Three restored streetcars formerly used by TCRT are used and the Museum has built a replica 1900 station at the intersection of Queen Ave and 42nd Street.

Excelsior Streetcar Line

The Excelsior Streetcar Line began operation in 1999 in west-suburban Excelsior near Lake Minnetonka using Duluth Street Railway Company No. 78, transferred from the Museum's Como-Harriet Line. TCRT No. 1239 joined No. 78 in 2004. The Line is operated on the former Minneapolis and Saint Louis Railway right-of-way now used by the Hennepin County Regional Railroad Authority as a bicycle trail. All trips feature a tour of the Excelsior Carbarn, where Winona No. 10 is currently being restored and Mesaba No. 10 stored awaiting restoration.

DSR No. 78

Returned to service in 1991 after a seven-year restoration, Duluth Street Railway Company No. 78 is the oldest streetcar in the Museum, having been built by LaClede Car Company of Saint Louis, Missouri in 1893. The car, which was retired in 1911, is one of the oldest working streetcars in the country. It is a first-generation electric car that resembles the horse-drawn streetcars which it replaced. It has been operating on the Excelsior Streetcar Line since 1999.

TCRT No. 1239

TCRT No. 1239 was built at the 31st Street Shops in Minneapolis and has been restored to the configuration it had when it was constructed in 1907 with a private door to the motorman's cab in the front and double (later triple) stream wire gates for passenger access in the rear. This configuration required "two-man" operation, with a motorman in front who operated the streetcar, including opening and closing the gates, and a conductor at the rear who collected fares and helped with backing when necessary.

Many TCRT streetcars were converted to one-man/two-man operation in the 1930s by adding double-stream folding front doors and replacing the rear gates with similar doors. This gave TCRT the option to operate the car with only a motorman ("one man" operation), or, on busier routes, with a conductor and a motorman ("two man" operation). Because streetcar ridership remained high on many routes until the end of service in 1954, many "gate cars" with single-stream front folding doors remained in service until the end. TCRT No. 1239 returned to service in September 2004.

See also 
Other places with Twin City Rapid Transit hardware:
 Seashore Trolley Museum
 East Troy Electric Railroad Museum
 San Francisco Municipal Railway's Market Street Railway

Transit in Minnesota:
 Twin City Rapid Transit - original streetcars and bus lines in the Twin Cities
 Metro Transit (Minnesota) - current LRT and bus company in the Twin Cities

References

External links

 Minnesota Streetcar Museum

Railroad museums in Minnesota
Heritage railroads in Minnesota
Museums in Minneapolis
Streetcars in Minnesota
Museums in Hennepin County, Minnesota
Street railway museums in the United States